The American Physical Society honors members with the designation Fellow for having made significant accomplishments to the field of physics.

The following list includes those fellows selected since 2011.

2011

 Nikolaus Adams
 Claudia Draxl
 Jean-Philippe Ansermet
 William J. Atkinson
 Harut Avagyan
 Alexander Balandin
 Edward A. Baron
 Stephen Barr
 Manfred Bayer
 John Beamish
 Alice Bean
 Brian Bennett
 Michael Birse
 Steven Block
 Michael Bonitz
 John H. Booske
 Timothy Boykin
 Carl Brans
 Arne Brataas
 Alain Brizard
 April Brown
 Michael Brown
 Harald Brune
 Henrik Bruus
 Alessandra Buonanno
 Cathryn Carson
 Andrea Cavalleri
 Deepto Chakrabarty
 Tapash Chakraborty
 Robert Charity
 Michael Chertkov
 Ashot Chilingarian
 Min S. Chong
 Hans Christen
 Jason Cleveland
 Daniel Cox
 Nicholas Curro
 Curt Cutler
 Kari Dalnoki-Veress
 Peter Delfyett
 Regina Demina
 Mark Devlin
 Judith Driscoll
 Brett Dunlap
 Michael J. Edwards
 Robert Edwards
 Konstantin Efetov
 Eitan Ehrenfreund
 Aida El-Khadra
 Thomas Elsaesser
 Rolf Ent
 August Evrard
 Zhong Fang
 Marie Farge
 Edward Farhi
 Yuan Feng
 Andrea Carlo Ferrari
 Manfred Fiebig
 Jay Fineberg
 Noah Finkelstein
 Brenna L. Flaugher
 Robert C. Forrey
 Wendy Freedman
 Jonathan Freund
 Mette B. Gaarde
 Feng Gai
 Reimund Gerhard
 Timothy Germann
 Christopher Gerry
 Sandip Ghosal
 Walter Giele
 Michel J.P. Gingras
 David Ginley
 Michael Graham
 Fernando F. Grinstein
 Genda Gu
 Marina Guenza
 Shaul Hanany
 Werner Hanke
 Fiona Harrison
 Robert Hayes
 David Hedin
 Rigoberto Hernandez
 David Hinde
 John Hobbs
 Axel Hoffmann
 Donald Holmgren
 Minghwei Hong
 Howard Hu
 Danhong Huang
 Harold Hwang
 Chris Jacobsen
 Marcelo Jaime
 Chueng-Ryong Ji
 Ralf Kaiser
 Robin Kaiser
 Yukio Kaneda
 Jordan Katine
 Jonathan Katz
 Massoud Kaviany
 Sarah L. Keller
 Jacob Khurgin
 Joshua Klein
 Joseph Klewicki
 Gerhard Klimeck
 Volker Koch
 Svetlana Kotochigova
 Anna Krylov
 Michael Kurtz
 Mark Kuzyk
 Raymond Laflamme
 Bruce Law
 Feng Liu
 Gui Long
 Patrick Lukens
 Jonathan Machta
 Andrew Mackenzie
 Krishnan Mahesh
 Naomi C. Makins
 H. Jonathon Mamin
 Paul Mantsch
 Piero Martin
 C. Jeff Martoff
 Tsutomu Mashimo
 James M. Matthews
 Michael McCarthy
 Julie McEnery
 Jr McKee
 Colin McKinstrie
 Desmond McMorrow
 Constantine Megaridis
 Thomas Mehlhorn
 Carl Meinhart
 Kirill Menikov
 Vincent Meunier
 Bogdan Mihaila
 Evgeny Mishin
 Vladimir Mitin
 Rajat Mittal
 Piet Mulders
 David Muller
 James Napolitano
 Vijay Narayanan
 Chetan Nayak
 David E. Newman
 Yosef Nir
 Beatriz Noheda
 Jeremy O'Brien
 Yuri Oganessian
 Serdar Ogut
 Maxim Olchanyi
 Hans Paetz gen. Schieck
 Christoph Paus
 Dvora Perahia
 Kirk Peterson
 A. Phelps
 Darrin Pochan
 Antonio Politi
 Stephen Pordes
 Scott Pratt
 Dean Preston
 Frans Pretorius
 Ruslan Prozorov
 Johann Rafelski
 William Rees
 Daniel Reich
 Charles Reichhardt
 Cynthia Reichhardt
 Oscar Reula
 Adam Riess
 Thorsten Ritz
 John Robertson
 Rodney Ruoff
 Marianna S. Safronova
 Susumu Saito
 Dilano Saldin
 Thomas Sangster
 Eric Schiff
 Peter J. Schmid
 Mathias Schuber
 Daniel K. Schwartz
 Earl Scime
 Joan Shea
 Jian Shen
 Gary Shiu
 Alexander Shluger
 Manfred Sigrist
 Chandralekha Singh
 John Smolin
 Christopher Soles
 Gary Staebler
 Kenneth Stalder
 Alexei Starobinsky
 Ady Stern
 Yuri Suzuki
 Adam Szczepaniak
 Yoshiro Takahashi
 Zlatko Tesanovic
 Jennifer Thomas
 Uwe Thumm
 Terry Tritt
 Nandini Trivedi
 Lev Tsimring
 Ophelia Tsui
 Mark Tuominen
 Eric Van Stryland
 Ashok Vaseashta
 Cristina Volpe
 Barry C. Walker
 Lian-Ping Wang
 Xiaogang Wang
 Yuh-Lin Wang
 Eric Weeks
 Ching-Ming Wei
 Robert A. Weller
 Andrew White
 Magnus Willander
 Howard Wiseman
 George Wong
 Gerard Wong
 Michael Wraback
 Stephen Wukitch
 Tao Xiang
 John Xiao
 Hiroaki Yamamoto
 Yanfa Yan
 Jinlong Yang
 Kun Yang
 Syun-Ru Yeh
 Yosef Yeshurun
 Albert Young
 Paolo Zanardi
 Ruhong Zhou
 Shiyao Zhu
 Xiaoyang Zhu
 Yuntian Zhu
 Stefano de Gironcoli

2012

 Joanna Aizenberg
 Rufina Alamo
 P. Henrik Alfredsson
 Maria Allegrini
 Igor Altfeder
 William Anderson
 John Arrington
 Elke-Caroline Aschenauer
 Markus Aspelmeyer
 Alán Aspuru-Guzik
 Luis M. Balicas
 Wei Bao
 Robert Bari
 Emanuela Barzi
 Rashid Bashir
 Xavier Batlle
 Silas Beane
 James J. Beatty
 Raymond Beausoleil
 Kamran Behnia
 Alexey Belyanin
 Carlos A. Bertulani
 Marcela M. Bilek
 Jeffrey C. Blackmon
 Robert H. Blick
 Jonathan C. Boettger
 Neil K. Bourne
 Raphael Bousso
 Nora Brambilla
 Howard Branz
 Joel D. Brock
 Ralf A. Bundschuh
 Bruce A. Bunker
 John Byrd
 Marc Cahay
 Robert Cammarata
 Robert W. Carpick
 Thomas F. Carruthers
 Michael E. Chandross
 Chia-Seng Chang
 Gang Chen
 Shi-Jie Chen
 Cheng-Chung Chi
 Vincenzo Cirigliano
 James P. Colgan
 Reuben T. Collins
 David M. Cook
 Paul Cottle
 Priscilla Cushman
 Bhanu Das
 Sridhara Dasu
 Donal Day
 Andre Luiz De Gouvea
 Glenn Decker
 Marcellinus Demarteau
 Eugene Demler
 Daniel J. Den Hartog
 Benoit Deveaud
 Paul Deyoung
 Massimiliano Di Ventra
 Jens Dilling
 Andris M. Dimits
 Nikolay Dokholyan
 David R. Dowling
 Mitra Dutta
 Ulrich Eckern
 Samy El-Shall
 Bengt Eliasson
 Mark A. Eriksson
 Claudia Felser
 Juan C. Fernandez
 Dino Fiorani
 Donald G. Fleming
 Johan Frenje
 Amalie Frischknecht
 Bruce Fryxell
 Christopher Fuchs
 Dmitry Fursa
 Alfonso M. Ganan-Calvo
 Venkatraghavan Ganesan
 Anupam K. Garg
 Steven Giddings
 Douglas Glenzinski
 Dan M. Goebel
 Rachel Goldman
 Venkatraman Gopalan
 Nikolai Gorelenkov
 Daniel Gottesman
 Alexandre O. Govorov
 Christoph Grein
 Terry W. Gullion
 Chunlei Guo
 Ephraim Gutmark
 Satoshi Hamaguchi
 Lene V. Hau
 Andreas J. Heinrich
 Stuart Henderson
 Dan S. Henningson
 Mark C. Hermann
 Mark C. Hersam
 Wayne P. Hess
 Peter Hoeflich
 Richard A. Holt
 William L. Holzapfel
 Anette E. Hosoi
 Huan Z. Huang
 John P. Huennekens
 Scott Hughes
 Joseph Incandela
 Tom Intrator
 Balasubramanian Iyer
 Wonho Jhe
 Kui-juan Jin
 Michelle D. Johannes
 Robert Johnson
 Stephen R. Julian
 Namanja Kaloper
 Demosthenes Kazanas
 Galina Khitrova
 Yong-Baek Kim
 Sergey Klimenko
 Lloyd E. Knox
 Andrey Korytov
 Petros Koumoutsakos
 Yuri Kovchegov
 Todd D. Krauss
 Young Kuk
 Daniel Kulp
 Milind N. Kunchur
 Makoto Kuwata-Gonokami
 Akhlesh Lakhtakia
 Alex Lazarian
 Valeri Lebedev
 Norman R. Lebowitz
 Chris Leighton
 David M. Leitner
 Christopher Li
 Derun Li
 James Liddle
 Zoltan Ligeti
 Jingyu Lin
 Robert P. Lin
 Ronald Lipton
 Kai Liu
 Mathias Loesche
 Lynn Loo
 Turab Lookman
 Carlos Lousto
 Li Lu
 Frederick C. MacKintosh
 Hernan A. Makse
 Paul Mantica
 Stephen Martin
 Neil D. Mathur
 Benjamin McCall
 Martha R. McCartney
 Baruch Meerson
 David E. Meltzer
 Jie Meng
 Dirk Klaus Morr
 Stephen W. Morris
 William Munro
 Steve Myers
 Alan Nakatani
 Douglas Natelson
 Heidi Jo Newberg
 Shouleh Nikzad
 Bernd R. Noack
 Peter Norreys
 Alexander Novokhatski
 Hideo Ohno
 Takaharu Otsuka
 Howard Padmore
 Hyeon K. Park
 Neelesh A. Patankar
 Heinz Pitsch
 Alexios Polychronakos
 Dragana Popovic
 Arian Pregenzer
 Fei Qi
 Ronald Redmer
 Joan Redwing
 David A. Reis
 Fritz Riehle
 Peter S. Riseborough
 David Robin
 Christopher M. Roland
 Mikhail V. Romalis
 Aaron Roodman
 Daniel H. Rothman
 Sheila Rowan
 Karissa Sanbonmatsu
 Michael B. Santos
 Sergey Saveliev
 Sergej Savrasov
 Alexander A. Schekochihin
 Christian Schonenberger
 Carl B. Schroeder
 William W. Schultz
 Achim Schwenk
 Richard Seto
 Mark D. Shattuck
 Jing Shi
 David C. Shiner
 Michelle Shinn
 Susan B. Sinnott
 Chris Sorensen
 Stephen Southworth
 Eliot Specht
 Ian Spielman
 Mark Spitzer
 Dan Moss Stamper-Kurn
 Phillip C. Stancil
 John F. Stanton
 Susanne Stemmer
 Iain Stewart (physicist)
 Qichang Su
 Robert Svoboda
 Minas Tanielian
 Max Tegmark
 Luc Thomas
 Sigurdur T. Thoroddsen
 Zoltan Toroczkai
 Tonica Valla
 Marc Vanderhaeghen
 Oleg V. Vasilyev
 Ivan Vitev
 Vladan Vuletic
 Doreen Wackeroth
 Hongfei Wang
 Mu Wang
 Nan Lin Wang
 Shan X. Wang
 Yun Wang
 James Watkins
 Thomas Weinacht
 Mark C. Williams
 John M. Wills
 Robert A. Wolkow
 Richard P. Woodard
 Zhen Wu
 Peng Xiong
 Amir Yacoby
 Jihui Yang
 Minami Yoda
 Qiming Zhang
 Xiaoguang Zhang
 Zhengguo Zhao
 Xiaowei Zhuang
 Gergely T. Zimanyi
 Carlos A. R. Sa de Melo

2013

 Darin E. Acosta
 Fred C. Adams
 Anatoli Afanasjev
 Pamir Alpay
 Brian P. Anderson
 Joerg Appenzeller
 Leon M. Balents
 John Charles Barbour
 Randy A. Bartels
 John F. Beacom
 Matthew C. Beard
 Krzysztof Belczynski
 John H. Belk
 Ilan Benjamin
 Claire Berger
 Jan E. Beyea
 Sandra G. Biedron
 David G. Blair
 Thomas F. Boggess, Jr
 Sergey Bravyi
 Yunhai Cai
 David Carroll
 Charles Cerjan
 William A. Challener
 Premala Chandra
 Christine Charles
 Hongyu Chen
 Yang Chen
 Kingman Cheung
 Margaret S. Cheung
 Thomas Chou
 Kenneth T. Christensen
 Noel T. Clemens
 Robert W. Collins
 Neil J. Cornish
 Costantino Creton
 Stefano Curtarolo
 Giacomo Mauro D'Ariano
 Karin A. Dahmen
 Jean Dalibard
 Viatcheslav V. Danilov
 Alejandro L. De Lozanne
 Steven L. Detweiler
 Willem H. Dickhoff
 Mark M. Disko
 Bogdan A. Dobrescu
 Paul J. Dolan, Jr
 Marija Drndic
 Vladimir Dzuba
 Paul Fallon
 Paul Fendley
 Jimmy J. Feng
 Charles D. Ferguson II
 Gennady Fiksel
 Alexander Finkelstein
 Ian R. Fisher
 Bonnie T. Fleming
 John F. Foss
 Alexandra Gade
 Dmitry Garanin
 Susan V. Gardner
 Robert J. Garisto
 David Gates
 Thierry Giamarchi
 Paolo Giannozzi
 Charles J. Glinka
 Nickolay Y. Gnedin
 John C. Gore
 Rama Govindarajan
 Charles Greenfield (physicist)
 David Grier
 Jeffrey C. Grossman
 Alexei Gruverman
 Hua Guo
 Shangjr F. Gwo
 David S. Hall
 Katherine Harkay
 Zahid Hasan
 Karsten M. Heeger
 Wouter D. Hoff
 Stephen E. Holland
 Suxing Hu
 Thomas L. Jackson
 David E. Jaffe
 Yogesh Jaluria
 Ulrich D. Jentschura
 Arne Johansson
 Thomas W. Jones
 Cherie R. Kagan
 Nasser Kalantar-Nayestanaki
 Alex Kamenev
 Adam Kaminski
 Josef A. Kas
 David Kastor
 Michael Keidar
 Scott J. Kenyon
 James M. Kikkawa
 Tom Kirchner
 Rami Kishek
 Boaz Klima
 Randall D. Knight
 Marcus D. Knudson
 Viatcheslav Kokoouline
 Diana L. Kormos Buchwald
 Steven K. Korotky
 V. Krishnamurthy
 Ondrej L. Krivanek
 Leeor Kronik
 Patrice Le Gal
 Seunghun Lee
 Yoonseok Lee
 Konrad Lehnert
 Walter Lempert
 Bao-An Li
 Baowen Li
 Qiang Li
 Steven L. Liebling
 J. Ping Liu
 Jie Liu
 Erik Luijten
 Robert Lysak
 Anatoly Maksimchuk
 John B. Marston
 Nils Martensson
 Hedi M. Mattoussi
 Manos Mavrikakis
 Robert D. Mawhinney
 Kevin F. McCarty
 Patrick McCray
 Mark D. Messier
 Roman G. Mints
 Chandrashekhar Mishra
 Daniel Mittleman
 John Moody
 Joel E. Moore
 Jeffrey Morris
 David P. Morrison
 Adilson E. Motter
 V. Parameswaran Nair
 Ranganathan Narayanan
 Petr Navrátil
 Jeffrey B. Neaton
 John J. Neumeier
 Josep Nogues
 George S. Nolas
 Valentyn Novosad
 Luis A. Nunes Amaral
 Christopher K. Ober
 James D. Olsen
 Fiorenzo Omenetto
 Benjamin J. Owen
 Lyman A. Page
 Josef Paldus
 Thomas T.M. Palstra
 Jian-Wei Pan
 Xiaoqing Pan
 Fulvio Parmigiani
 Pravesh Patel
 Vasili V. Perebeinos
 Frank Petriello
 Olivier R. Pfister
 Leo E. Piilonen
 Steven J. Plimpton
 Martin K.W. Pohl
 Thomas Powers
 Eric J. Prebys
 Han Pu
 Chandra Raman
 Simon Raoux
 Markus B. Raschke
 Leonard F. Register
 Alejandro Rey
 Martin C. Richardson
 Elisa Riedo
 Thomas G. Rizzo
 Adrian Roitberg
 Gunther M. Roland
 Stephan Rosenkranz
 S. David Rosner
 Markus Roth
 Brian T. Saam
 Celeste Sagui
 Christophe E. Salomon
 Fernando Sannibale
 Michael F. Schatz
 Stefan E. Schippers
 Christoph Schmidt
 Klaus Schmidt-Rohr
 Andrew Schmitt
 Marilyn Beth Schneider
 Robert W. Schoenlein
 Kate Scholberg
 Roman Schrittwieser
 Eric R. Schwegler
 Uros Seljak
 Daniel A. Shaddock
 Jie Shan
 Donna Sheng
 Zheng-Ming Sheng
 Deirdre M. Shoemaker
 Joern I. Siepmann
 Zuzanna S. Siwy
 Charles Skinner
 Dennis Slafer
 Michael S. Smith
 William M. Snow
 Jorge O. Sofo
 Alfredo Soldati
 Gabriel C. Spalding
 David N. Spergel
 Matthias Steffen
 Hans-Peter Steinrueck
 Mikhail Stephanov
 James M. Stone
 Hyung Jin Sung
 Timothy M.P. Tait
 Makariy A. Tanatar
 Uwe C. Tauber
 Harry B. Thacker
 Ian J. Thompson
 Francis X. Timmes
 Douglas J. Tobias
 Senthil Todadri
 Leonid A. Turkevich
 James M. Valles
 Jan Van Ruitenbeek
 Roberto Verzicco
 Jorge Vinals
 Ashvin Vishwanath
 Robert B. Vogelaar
 Stamatis Vokos
 Willem L. Vos
 Jian Wang
 Wei-Hua Wang
 Justin S. Wark
 James D. Wells
 Hai-Hu Wen
 Steven Wereley
 Jose E. Wesfreid
 Stefan Westerhoff
 Angela K. Wilson
 Boleslaw Wyslouch
 Yijing Yan
 Chien-Peng Yuan
 Jiang Zhao
 Steven J. Zinkle
 Jian-Min Zuo
 Hugo W. van der Hart

2014

 Peter Abbamonte
 David W. Abraham
 Vladimir Aksyuk
 Mary Alberg
 Alan Alda
 Michael Altman
 Jacques Amar
 Shelley L. Anna
 Elke Arenholz
 Michael R. Armstrong
 Peter B. Arnold
 David M. Asner
 Donald R. Baer
 Mei Bai
 Stuart D. Bale
 Kaustav Banerjee
 Jean-Louis Barrat
 Christopher P.J. Barty
 Steffen A. Bass
 Kevin E. Bassler
 Cristian D. Batista
 Raymond J. Beach
 Mark T. Bernius
 Alexey Bezryadin
 Lars Bildsten
 Mary R. Bishai
 Michael R. Bockstaller
 Steven E. Boggs
 Stanislav A. Boldyrev
 Corwin H. Booth
 Jordi Boronat
 Malcolm G. Boshier
 Philippe Bouyer
 Iain D. Boyd
 Roy Briere
 David A. Broido
 Duncan A. Brown
 Karen L. Byrum
 Debra A. Callahan
 John M. Campbell
 Andrew M. Canning
 Lincoln D. Carr
 Troy Carter
 Colm-Cille P. Caulfield
 Hugues Chate
 Guanhua Chen
 Cheng Chin
 Herman Clercx
 Luigi Colombo
 John O. Dabiri
 Andrea Damascelli
 Marcos Dantus
 Dana Dattelbaum
 Luiz Davidovich
 Abhay L. Deshpande
 Tiziana Di Matteo
 Yujie Ding
 Stephen K. Doorn
 Wolfgang Ertmer
 Fernando A. Escobedo
 Morten R. Eskildsen
 Michelle A. Espy
 Tilman Esslinger
 William M. Fawley
 Peter Fischer
 Randy Fishman
 Karen A. Flack
 Marcel Franz
 John W. Freeland
 Jay M. Gambetta
 Oleg Gang
 Margaret Gardel
 Valeriy Ginzburg
 Larry D. Gladney
 Daniel I. Goldman
 Antonios Gonis
 Kenneth E. Goodson
 Senta V. Greene
 Ross W. Griffiths
 Jinghua Guo
 Eva Halkiadakis
 Alex Hamilton
 Deborah A. Harris
 Frederic V. Hartemann
 Avetik R. Harutyunyan
 Ahmed Hassanein
 Jay Hauser
 Elizabeth A. Hays
 Olle G. Heinonen
 C. Stephen Hellberg
 Stephen Hill
 Rong-Ming Ho
 Mahir S. Hussein
 Nobuhiko Izumi
 Bret E. Jackson
 Changqing Jin
 Borje Johansson
 John M. Jowett
 Serafim Kalliadasis
 David E. Kaplan
 Victoria Kaspi
 Reizo Kato
 Declan F. Keane
 Pawel J. Keblinski
 Wai-Yee Keung
 Panayotis Kevrekidis
 William P. King
 Douglas A. Kirkpatrick
 Valery D. Kiryukhin
 Paul Koenraad
 Arthur Kosowsky
 Feodor V. Kusmartsev
 Vincent P. LaBella
 Mohamed Laradji
 Michael I. Larkin
 Andrei G. Lebed
 Dean Lee
 Sang Joon Lee
 Anthony W. Leonard
 Richard A. Lesar
 Janna Levin
 Ju Li
 Ching-Long Lin
 Natalia M. Litchinitser
 Despina A. Louca
 H. Peter Lu
 Margaret Malloy
 Roberto C. Mancini
 Joseph V. Mantese
 Zhiqiang Mao
 Laura E. Marcucci
 Andrew H. Marcus
 Ernesto E. Marinero
 Sera Markoff
 Nicola Marzari
 Angelo Mascarenhas
 Spiridoula C. Matsika
 Jose Menendez
 Amber D. Miller
 Kimball A. Milton
 Leonid Mirny
 Cristopher Moore
 Roberto Morandotti
 Colin Morningstar
 David R. Morrison
 Erich J. Mueller
 Guido Mueller
 Marcus Muller
 Christopher J. Mundy
 Kohji Nakamura
 Qing Nie
 Tom Osborne
 John H. Page
 Ravindra Pandey
 M. Alessandra Papa
 Thomas F. Papenbrock
 David Pappas
 Arne J. Pearlstein
 Michael R. Pennington
 Rosalba Perna
 Tilman Pfau
 Anh Tuan Phan
 So-Young Pi
 Maria N. Piancastelli
 Arkady Pikovsky
 Alberto Pique
 Kevin T. Pitts
 Randolf Pohl
 Andrew Pollard
 Alan W.P. Poon
 Alain J. Pumir
 Hong Qin
 Ralf F. Rapp
 Ana Maria Rey
 Andrew G. Rinzler
 George Rodriguez
 Aldo H. Romero
 Federico Rosei
 Peter C. Rowson
 Robert E. Rudd
 Stephen E. Russek
 David N. Ruzic
 Andrew S. Sachrajda
 Farid Salama
 Bahaa E.A. Saleh
 Robin Santra
 Kausik Sarkar
 Avadh B. Saxena
 David J. Schlegel
 John A. Schlueter
 Joerg Schmiedmayer
 Robert M. Schofield
 Michael P. Schultz
 Reinhard A. Schumacher
 Terrence J. Sejnowski
 Jonathan V. Selinger
 Klaus Sengstock
 Ram Seshadri
 Boris Shapiro
 Zhen-Su She
 Li Shi
 Stephen A. Slutz
 Marc K. Smith
 Sara A. Solla
 Maria Spiropulu
 Hariharan Srikanth
 Suzanne T. Staggs
 Philip Stamp
 Stepan Stepanyan
 Steven Strogatz
 Shufang Su
 Wu-Pei Su
 Bobby G. Sumpter
 Bengt G. Svensson
 Grzehorz Szamel
 Atsushi Takahara
 Yoshitaka Tanimura
 Suzanne Te Velthuis
 Scott Thomas
 Joseph H. Thywissen
 James G. Tobin
 Jeffrey A. Tostevin
 Andre-Marie Tremblay
 Sergei Tretiak
 Michael S. Triantafyllou
 Carsten-Andreas Ullrich
 Bart Van Wees
 Julia Velkovska
 Lorenza Viola
 Joshua Wand
 Cai-Zhuang Wang
 Meng Wang
 Yinmin Wang
 Z. Jane Wang
 Kevin J. Webb
 Chris H. Wiggins
 Fred Wolf
 Vitaly Yakimenko
 Lin Yin
 Peter H. Yoon
 Feng Yuan
 A. Zee
 Bing Zhang
 Jiandi Zhang
 Wenqing Zhang
 Alexander V. Zlobin
 Jesus A. del Alamo

2015

 Artem Abanov
 Johan Akerman
 Mark Alford
 Andrea Alu
 Hiroshi Amano
 Douglas Arion
 Daniel Arovas
 Tariq Aslam
 James Babb
 Steven Batha
 Laura Baudis
 Eric Bauer
 Lothar Bauerdick
 Sergey Belomestnykh
 Lee Bernstein
 Noam Bernstein
 Emanuele Berti
 Manuel Bibes
 Krastan Blagoev
 Immanuel Bloch
 Thomas Blum
 Peter Blunden
 Stephen Bradforth
 Silke Buehler-Paschen
 Laura Cadonati
 Gretchen Campbell
 Erica Carlson
 Ashton Carter
 Sue Carter
 Scott Chambers
 Hou-Tong Chen
 Jeff Chen
 Yanbei Chen
 Zhigang Chen
 Majed Chergui
 Hsiao-Mei Cho
 Carson Chow
 Daniel Claes
 Roderick Clark
 David Cobden
 James Cochran
 David G. Cory
 Dennis Coyne
 Alfred Crosby
 John D'Auria
 Jose D'Incao
 Diego Alejandro Dalvit
 Stuart Dalziel
 Hooman Davoudiasl
 Anne De Wit
 Kaushik De
 Brian DeMarco
 Pablo Debenedetti
 Ricardo Decca
 Per Delsing
 Stavros Demos
 Daniel Dessau
 Haim Diamant
 Roland Diehl
 Tomasz Dietl
 Fiorenza Donato
 Michael Drewsen
 Berge Englert
 Dean Evans
 Marco Fanciulli
 Craig Fennie
 Jaime Fernandez-Baca
 Douglas Finkbeiner
 Gleb Finkelstein
 Jerzy Floryan
 Steven Frautschi
 Mark Freeman
 Stefan Funk
 Ivo Furno
 Maurice Garcia-Sciveres
 David Gerdes
 Oliver Gessner
 Tony Gherghetta
 Thomas Gorczyca
 Martin Grant
 Thomas Greenslade
 Julie Grollier
 Michael Gronau
 Matthias Grosse Perdekamp
 Roger Hagengruber
 Hans Hallen
 Daniel Haskel
 Guowei He
 Xiao-Gang He
 Christopher Hearty
 Stefan Hell
 Zhirong Huang
 Bruce Hunt
 Giuseppe Iannaccone
 Bhuvnesh Jain
 Frank Jenko
 Byungnam Kahng
 James Kakalios
 Sergei V. Kalinin
 Gamani Karunasiri
 Roland Kawakami
 Vasili Kharchenko
 Ki Kim
 Mackillo Kira
 Anatoly Kolomeisky
 Eiichiro Komatsu
 Jeffrey Koseff
 Yakov Krasik
 Roman Krems
 Graham Kribs
 Hulikal Krishnamurthy
 Satish Kumar
 Viswanathan Kumaran
 Shane Larson
 George V. Lauder
 O Lavrentovich
 Richard Lebed
 Liliane Leger
 Andre Levchenko
 Xiaoqin Li
 Tianquan Lian
 Ron Lifshitz
 Don Lincoln
 Junming Liu
 Abraham Loeb
 Mark Lumsden
 Yu-Gang Ma
 Grzegorz Madejski
 Vidya Madhavan
 Niels Madsen
 John Maier
 Thomas Maier
 Michael Manfra
 Tariq Manzur
 Ivar Martin
 Omar Matar
 Konstantin Matchev
 Francesco Mauri
 Stephane Mazevet
 Thomas Meitzler
 Carlos Meriles
 Igor Mezic
 Pierre Michel
 Kalman Migler
 Timothy Minton
 Prabhakar Misra
 Vesna Mitrovic
 W Mochan
 Roderich Moessner
 Jorge Morfin
 James Nagle
 Kae Nemoto
 Dwight Neuenschwander
 Dinh Nguyen
 Joseph Niemela
 Filomena Nunes
 Vivian O'Dell
 Choo-Hiap Oh
 Ivan Oleynik
 Kostas Orginos
 David Osborn
 Feryal Ozel
 Ning Pan
 V. Adrian Parsegian
 Thomas Pedersen
 J. Pendry
 Alan Perelson
 Alexey Petrov
 Cedomir Petrovic
 Eli Piasetzky
 Yuan Ping
 Leonid Pismen
 Antoni Planes
 Michel Pleimling
 Matthew Poelker
 Steven Pollock
 James Proudfoot
 Gulshan Rai
 Ramamurthy Ramprasad
 Scott Ransom
 Elie Raphael
 Sean Regan
 Marcos Rigol
 Charles Roland
 Filip Ronning
 John Rumble
 Roger Rusack
 Tanusri Saha-Dasgupta
 Daniel Sanchez-Portal
 Alexander Saunders
 Stephan Schlamminger
 Ira Schwartz
 Rachel A. Segalman
 Peter Shaffer
 Eugene Shakhnovich
 Michael A Shay
 Javid Sheikh
 Mengyan Shen
 Troy Shinbrot
 Kirill Shtengel
 Irfan Siddiqi
 Daniel Sigg
 Mary Silber
 Daniel Sinars
 Patrick Slane
 Vladimir Smalyuk
 Alexei Sokolov
 Stefan Soldner-Rembold
 Todd Squires
 Richard Staley
 Frank Steglich
 Daniel Steinberg
 Richard Steinberg
 Frederick Streitz
 Liling Sun
 Eric Suraud
 Kenneth Suslick
 Damian Swift
 Charles Tahan
 Shina Tan
 Hirohisa Tanaka
 Xinfeng Tang
 Benn Tannenbaum
 Janet Tate
 Dave Thirumalai
 Edward Thomas
 Rodger Thompson
 David Toback
 Federico Toschi
 Mark Trodden
 Thomas Truskett
 Yaroslav Tserkovnyak
 Tolek Tyliszczak
 Dmitri Uzdensky
 Ilya Vekhter
 Latha Venkataraman
 Kai Vetter
 David Vitali
 Thomas Vojta
 Jelena Vuckovic
 Philip Walther
 Benjamin Wandelt
 Alan Weinstein
 Bernard Whiting
 Ferdinand Willeke
 Michael Wittmann
 Pieter Ten Wolde
 Michael Wright
 Xiaohua Wu
 Glen Wurden
 Vladislav Yakovlev
 Jie Yan
 Yang Yang
 Stefano Zapperi
 Zhuomin Zhang
 Xiaochao Zheng
 Michael Zudov

2016

 Alexander Abanov
 Nicholas Abbott
 Edward Adler
 Mina Aganagic
 Giorgio Apollinari
 Ian Appelbaum
 Philip Argyres
 Harry Atwater
 Richard Averitt
 Nigel Badnell
 Thomas W. Baumgarte
 Rachel Bean
 Timothy C. Beers
 L. Douglas Bell
 Nicole Bell
 Adam Bernstein
 Sergio Bertolucci
 Andrea L. Bertozzi
 Antonio Bianconi
 Jiri Bicak
 Eric R. Bittner
 Ken Bloom
 Jose A. Boedo
 Peter Bosted
 Igal Brener
 Robert G.W. Brown
 Todd A. Brun
 Amir Caldeira
 James M. Caruthers
 Fausto Cattaneo
 Simon Catterall
 Christopher T. Chantler
 Hui Chen
 Yong P. Chen
 Vladimir Chernyak
 Junhan Cho
 Kyeongjae Cho
 Daniel Chung
 Marcus Cicerone
 Stéphane Coutu
 Csaba Csáki
 Raissa M. D'Souza
 Christine Darve
 Gabor David
 Christine Davies
 Matthew Davis
 William Detmold
 Aaron Dinner
 Günther Dissertori
 Aaron Dominguez
 Megan Donahue
 Axel Drees
 Nirit Dudovich
 Yossef Elabd
 Robert Endres
 Peter Engels
 Hongyou Fan
 Hume A. Feldman
 Donglai Feng
 Gregory A. Fiete
 Patrick Fox
 Dieter Frekers
 Valery V. Frolov
 Makoto C. Fujiwara
 Herbert O. Funsten
 Laura Gagliardi
 John Galambos
 Cameron Guy Geddes
 Ahmed Ghoniem
 George N. Gibson
 Vladimir Glebov
 Punit Gohil
 Steven Goldfarb
 Maarten F. Golterman
 Paolo Gondolo
 Michael S. Gordon
 Gianluca Gregori
 Ilya Gruzberg
 Robert Grzywacz
 Vitalyi Gusev
 Richard L. Gustavsen
 Jack Harris
 Charles Henderson
 Laura Heyderman
 Sascha Hilgenfeldt
 Christopher Hill
 Ann Hornschemeier
 Kalina Hristova
 Hui Hu
 Omar A. Hurricane
 Muhammad M. Hussain
 Andrew Hutton
 Subramanian Iyer
 Felix M. Izrailev
 Jamal Jalilian-Marian
 Anderson Janotti
 Paul Johnson
 Ann Hornschemeier
 Ezekiel Johnston-Halperin
 Mercouri Kanatzidis
 Andreas Karch
 Brian Keating
 Richard L. Kelley
 Krzysztof Kempa
 Hugh Kendrick
 Sinan Keten
 Young-June Kim
 Tobias Kippenberg
 John Kitching
 John L. Kline
 Kimitoshi Kono
 Joel D Kress
 Andreas Kreyssig
 Guruswamy Kumaraswamy
 Steven Lambert
 Andrew J. Landahl
 Michael Landry
 Karol Lang
 Eric Lauga
 Adrian Lee
 Ho Nyung Lee
 Amiram Leviatan
 Laura H. Lewis
 Laurent Limat
 Yueqiang Liu
 J. Timothy Londergan
 Micah Lowenthal
 Robert Lucchese
 François Léonard
 Nina Markovic
 Beverley McKeon
 Frédéric Merkt
 Jianwei "John" Miao
 Angelos Michaelides
 Michiko G. Minty
 Andrea Morello
 Miguel Mostafá
 Anthony Murphy
 Pietro Musumeci
 Ágnes Mócsy
 Ilya Nemenman
 Keir Neuman
 Brian W. O'Shea
 Martin Oberlack
 Satoshi Okamoto
 Kathryn M. Olesko
 William D. Oliver
 Scott M. Oser
 Stephen Padalino
 Demetrios T. Papageorgiou
 David H. Parker
 Matteo Pasquali
 Hiranya Peiris
 Suhithi M. Peiris
 Natalia Perkins
 Peter Petreczky
 Thomas Pfeifer
 Andreas Piepke
 Sergio Pirozzoli
 Monica Plisch
 Mason Porter
 Marek Potemski
 John D. Prestage
 Clement Pryke
 Jean-Michel Raimond
 Ganpati Ramanath
 Sriram Ramaswamy
 Wouter-Jan Rappel
 George H. Rawitscher
 Mike Reeks
 Jason Reese
 Cindy Regal
 Mary T. Rodgers
 Sven Rogge
 Leonid Rokhinson
 J. Michael Roney
 Ricardo Ruiz
 Zvi Rusak
 Greg Salamo
 Pierre Savard
 Sandro Scandolo
 Charles A. Schmuttenmaer
 Athena S. Sefat
 Robin Selinger
 Peter N. Shanahan
 Spencer Sherwin
 Eva Silverstein
 Marc Simon
 Ivan Smalyukh
 Evgenya Smirnova-Simakov
 Sunil V. Somalwar
 Jonathan E. Spanier
 Ulrich Sperhake
 Donald A. Spong
 Keivan Stassun
 Robin T. Stebbins
 Christoph Steier
 Mathias B. Steiner
 Timothy J. Stelzer
 John Stewart
 Handong Sun
 Sean Sun
 Rebecca A. Surman
 Bruce R. Sutherland
 Noboru Takeuchi
 Jay X. Tang
 Xiao Tang
 Humberto Terrones
 John Texter
 Rebecca Thompson
 James E. Trebes
 John Tsamopoulos
 Emanuel Tutuc
 Wim Ubachs
 Jeffrey Urbach
 Maria-Roser Valentí
 Michele Vallisneri
 Maria Varela
 Kalman Varga
 Massimo Vergassola
 Matthieu Verstraete
 Feng Wang
 Haiyan Wang
 Xue-Bin Wang
 James A. Warren
 James H. Werner
 Daniel Whiteson
 Gary Wiederrecht
 Stephane Willocq
 Jianzhong Wu
 Mingming Wu
 Alan Wuosmaa
 John Wygant
 Qikun Xue
 Hiroshi Yamada
 Judith C. Yang
 Alexander L. Yarin
 Steven W. Yates
 Peide "Peter" Ye
 Edward Yu
 Roberto Zenit
 Xixiang Zhang
 Xingjiang Zhou
 Jian-Xin Zhu
 Richard W. Ziolkowski
 Hartmut Zohm
 Kathryn Zurek
 Igor Zutic
 Martin Zwierlein

2017

 Chris Adami
 Deji Akinwande
 Alexander V. Aleksandrov
 Ahmed Ali
 Gabrielle D. Allen
 N. R. Aluru
 Adrian Bachtold
 Radha Bahukutumbi
 John G. Baker
 Nathan R. Barton
 Christian W. Bauer
 Matthias Bauer
 Anatoly B. Belonoshko
 William A. Bertsche
 Susan K. Blessing
 Mischa Bonn
 Jean Pierre Boon
 Stephen J. Brice
 Alexey Burov
 Christopher David Carone
 Michael P. Carpenter
 Thomas L. Carroll
 David B. Cassidy
 Lou Cattafesta
 Suman Chakraborty
 Alexander L. Chernyshev
 Andy Christianson
 William Collins
 John Wesley Cooper
 Jolien D. Creighton
 Enrique Del Barco
 Hui Deng
 Maynard Dewey
 H. Thomas Diehl
 Jeff Eldredge
 Thomas H. Epps, III
 Charles R. Evans
 Lisa L. Everett
 Rafael M. Fernandes
 Richard Brian Firestone
 Christopher J. Fontes
 Anatoly I. Frenkel
 Dustin H. Froula
 Brent T. Fultz
 Michelle Girvan
 Bruce E. Gnade
 William H. Goldstein
 Ramin Golestanian
 Toshiyuki Gotoh
 Markus Greiner
 Eberhard K. U. Gross
 Peter H. Grutter
 Francisco Guinea
 Victor Gurarie
 Eric Keith Gustafson
 Carlos J. Gutierrez
 Zoran Hadzibabic
 Nancy M. Haegel
 Kawtar Hafidi
 Paul H. Halpern
 Igor Herbut
 Michael A. Hermele
 Bjoern Hof
 Georg Heinz Hoffstaetter
 Daniel Holz
 Dan Hooper
 Han Htoon
 Dragan Huterer
 William Thomas Mark Irvine
 Paul Janmey
 Debdeep Jena
 Neil F. Johnson
 Mihailo R. Jovanovic
 Keith A. Julien
 Daniel N. Kasen
 Toshihiko Kawano
 R. Scott Kemp
 Paul Kent
 Munira Khalil
 Ho-Young Kim
 Kee Hoon Kim
 Robert K. Kirkwood
 Lou Kondic
 Alex Kovner
 Vitaly V. Kresin
 Reiner Kruecken
 Chun Ning Lau
 Harvey S. Leff
 Adam K. Leibovich
 John W. Lewellen
 W. Vincent Liu
 Stefan Gregory Llewellyn Smith
 Wolfgang Losert
 Norbert Lutkenhaus
 Zhenqiang Ma
 Mikhail A. Malkov
 Vuk Mandic
 Stephane Mangin
 Thomas R. Mattsson
 Morgan May
 Michael A. McGuire
 Daniel McKinsey
 Raffaele Mezzenga
 Sushanta Mitra
 Niels Asger Mortensen
 Maxim Mostovoy
 Richard A. Moyer
 Eduardo R. Mucciolo
 Reshmi Mukherjee
 Shuichi Murakami
 Janice Lynn Musfeldt
 James Alan Musser
 James Richard Myra
 David B. Newell
 Yasunori Nomura
 Rachid Nouicer
 Corey Shane O'Hern
 Patrick I. Oden
 Yuval Oreg
 Miguel Orszag
 Gerardo Ortiz
 Zhe Yu J. Ou
 Johnpierre Paglione
 Ras B. Pandey
 Manfred Paulini
 Jonathan P. Pelz
 Thomas T. Perkins
 Aaron Thomas Pierce
 Fulvia Pilat
 Nikolai Pogorelov
 Frank C. Porter
 Mark Antonio Prelas
 Chilakamarri Rangacharyulu
 Juergen Rapp
 Margaret D. Reid
 Pedro M. Reis
 Dmitry Reznik
 William Ryu
 Raul Sanchez
 Andrei Sanov
 Rachel E. Scherr
 Daniel Schwartz
 Tommy Sewell
 A. Surjalal Sharma
 Lev Shchur
 Takasada Shibauchi
 Ernst Paul Sichtermann
 Laura Beth Smilowitz
 Michael Solomon
 Jun S. Song
 Bernardo Spagnolo
 Roxanne Patricia Springer
 Eric Stach
 Christopher M. Stafford
 Robert L. Stamps
 Francis Starr
 Peter Steinberg
 Gunter Steinmeyer
 Christian Stoeckl
 David M. Strom
 Hermann Suderow
 Nicholas B. Suntzeff
 Albert A. Talin
 Jacob Taylor
 James W. Taylor
 Mauricio Terrones
 Timo Thonhauser
 Xiao-Min Tong
 Stuart A. Trugman
 Surya P. Vanka
 Edo Waks
 Christopher William Walter
 Kang-Lung Wang
 Ziqiang Wang
 Risa Wechsler
 Roland Wester
 Steffen Wirth
 Lilia M. Woods
 Rosemary Wyse
 Yang Xia
 Susanne F. Yelin
 Han Woong Yeom
 Vivien Zapf
 Remco G. T. Zegers
 Chuanwei Zhang
 Jun Zhang
 Yong Zhang
 Shining Zhu
 Slobodan Zumer

2018

 Adekunle Adeyeye
 Rana X. Adhikari
 Brian J. Albright
 Moskov Amarian
 Yoichi Ando
 Carol E. Anway
 Alexandre Arenas
 David S. Armstrong
 Egor Babaev
 Diola Bagayoko
 Neil J. Balmforth
 Marjorie G. Bardeen
 Lisa Barsotti
 Martin Bazant
 Rainer D. Beck
 Andreas Becker
 Lorin X. Benedict
 Alexandre Blais
 Stefan Boettcher
 Scott K. Bogner
 Robert Boily
 Kerstin A. Borras
 Christoph Bostedt
 Eric Brewe
 Francoise Brochard-Wyart
 Kenneth R. Brown
 Elizabeth Buckley-Geer
 Helen Caines
 Paul Cassak
 Miguel A. Cazalilla
 Claudia Cenedese
 Siu-Wai Chan
 Benjamin Chandran
 Shailesh Chandrasekharan
 Kookrin Char
 Jacqueline H. Chen
 Gilbert Chu
 Ming-Chung Chu
 John C. Crocker
 Xi Dai
 Karen E. Daniels
 Ken Elder
 Henriette D. Elvang
 Robin D. Erbacher
 Lisa Fauci
 Amy K. Flatten
 Michael M. Fogler
 Mark D Foster
 Daniel J. Friedman
 Stephen A. Fulling
 Jason S. Gardner
 Eric J. Gawiser
 Philippe R. Ghosez
 David J. Goldhaber-Gordon
 Nir Goldman
 Vicki H. Grassian
 Amy L. R. Graves
 Salman Habib
 Gaute Hagen
 Timothy Halpin-Healy
 Ryan C. Hayward
 Johannes Hecker Denschlag
 Jennifer Hollingsworth
 Jiangping Hu
 Taku Izubuchi
 Pablo Jarillo-Herrero
 Brian J. Jensen
 Sangyong Jeon
 Kate L. Jones
 Alisher S. Kadyrov
 Hae-Young Kee
 Brian K. Kendrick
 Cynthia E. Keppel
 Nazir P. Kherani
 Lawrence E. Kidder
 Peggy A. Kidwell
 Derek F. Kimball
 Mimi A. R. Koehl
 Uwe R. Kortshagen
 Richard C. Lanza
 Shu Ping Lau
 Heather J. Lewandowski
 Xiuling Li
 Chen-Yu Liu
 Hoi-Kwong Lo
 Duncan Lorimer
 David K. Lubensky
 Andreas W. Ludwig
 Andrew G. MacPhee
 Lars Bojer Madsen
 Michael C. Martin
 Nadya Mason
 Masaaki Matsuda
 Sarah B. McKagan
 Ernesto A. Medina
 Mikhail V. Medvedev
 Noureddine Melikechi
 Aditi Mitra
 Emilia Morosan
 Conal Murray
 Donna Naples
 Abhay P. Narayan
 Takashi Nishikawa
 Teri W. Odom
 Grazyna Odyniec
 Hendrik Ohldag
 Wilma K. Olson
 Mark J. Oreglia
 Chinedum Osuji
 Jeffrey C. Owrutsky
 Willie J. Padilla
 Paul Padley
 M. Parans Paranthaman
 Enrico Ramirez-Ruiz
 Stephen C. Rand
 Oscar A. Rondon-Aramayo
 Jennifer L. Ross
 Clancy Rowley
 David Saintillan
 David P. Saltzberg
 Bruce D. Scott
 Trevor J. Sears
 Robert J. Semper
 Yasuhiko Sentoku
 Tatyana O. Sharpee
 Evan D. Skillman
 Richard G. Spencer
 Marcus Spradlin
 Ingrid Stairs
 Andrew Strominger
 Ignacio Taboada
 Keiji Tanaka
 Wolfgang R. Theobald
 Alexander Thomas
 James K. Thompson
 Patrice E. A. Turchi
 Alexander Valishev
 Jean-Luc Vay
 Vincenzo Vitelli
 LianTao Wang
 Mingsheng Wei
 Congjun Wu
 Junqiao Wu
 Ying Wu
 Qihua Xiong
 Ping Yang
 Shu Yang
 Chun-Yeol You
 Igor A. Zaliznyak
 Anatoli Zelenski
 Tanya Zelevinsky
 Ruiqin Zhang
 Nikolay Zheludev
 Jure Zupan

2019

 Wendy Adams
 Rajeev Ahuja
 Félicie Albert
 Husam N. Alshareef
 James G. Analytis
 Sonia Bacca
 Vijay Balasubramanian
 Jiming Bao
 Daniel Bazin
 Michael Begel
 Michael Markus Benedikt
 Mona Inesa Berciu
 Luc B. Bergé
 Katia Bertoldi
 Anand Bhattacharya
 Jens Biegert
 Daniel Boer
 Tulika Bose
 James William Bray
 Christoph Bruder
 Jasna Brujic
 Kimberly Susan Budil
 Richard J. Buttery
 Luciano Castillo
 Michael L. Chabinyc
 Pavel Cheben
 Xi Chen
 Yu-Ao Chen
 Steven Mark Christensen
 Luisa Cifarelli
 Amy L. Connolly
 Alessandra Corsi
 Gavin E. Crooks
 Wei Cui
 Mahananda Dasgupta
 Markus Deserno
 James H. Dickerson
 Zvonimir Dogic
 Shengwang Du
 Wenhui Duan
 Evgeny Epelbaum
 Tatiana Erukhimova
 Jutta E. Escher
 Matthew J. Evans
 Michael Lawrence Falk
 Flavio H. Fenton
 Francesca Ferlaino
 Joseph Angelo Formaggio
 Cristiano Galbiati
 Francois Gallaire
 Pascale Garaud
 Andrew Albert Geraci
 Stefan Gerhardt
 Yuri Gershtein
 Andrea M. Ghez
 Andrei Gritsan
 Stephen J. Hagen
 George Haller
 Hendrik F. Hamann
 Stephanie B. Hansen
 Ronald Hanson
 Kristjan Haule
 Hans W. Herrmann
 Hans Hilgenkamp
 George Wei-Shu Hou
 Gregory Gershom Howes
 Scott Chia Hsu
 Can-Ming Hu
 Patrick Huber
 Eric R. Hudson
 Alan James Hurd
 Gianluca Iaccarino
 Sohrab Ismail-Beigi
 Saurabh W. Jha
 Ying Jiang
 Anne Juel
 Robert A. Kaindl
 Rituparna Kanungo
 Matt Kim
 Tsuyoshi Kimura
 Matthias Friedrich Kling
 Markus Klute
 Robert Michael Konik
 Carolyn C. Kuranz
 Brian J. LeRoy
 Theodora Leventouri
 Matthias Ulf Liepe
 Anke Lindner
 Donghui Lu
 M. Lisa Manning
 Robert D. Mathieu
 José Fernando F Mendes
 Hope Michelsen
 Saskia Mioduszewski
 Stephen Monismith
 Holger Mueller
 Harry Norman Nelson
 Yasushi Ono
 Masaki Oshikawa
 Aydogan Ozcan
 Kent Paschke
 Matjaz Perc
 Jason R. Petta
 Raymond Jeffrey Phaneuf
 Silvia Picozzi
 Leanne C. Pitchford
 Viktor A. Podolskiy
 Katherine P. Prestridge
 Ji Qiang
 Sofia Quaglioni
 Idalia Ramos
 William Davis Ratcliff
 Jocelyn Samantha Read
 Juan M. Restrepo
 Gian-Marco Rignanese
 Harry Francis Robey
 Alexander Romanenko
 Dmitri A. Romanov
 Connie Barbara Roth
 Mary Beth Ruskai
 Mel S. Sabella
 Sayeef Salahuddin
 Omar A. Saleh
 Christian Santangelo
 B. S. Sathyaprakash
 Frank Schmidt
 Gerd E. Schroeder-Turk
 James Patarasp Sethna
 Joshua W. Shaevitz
 Peter Shawhan
 Uri Shumlak
 Carlos Silva
 Ivo S. Souza
 Dong Su
 Asle Sudbo
 Bernd Surrow
 Jack A. Syage
 Oleg V. Tchernyshyov
 Alexandre Tkatchenko
 Michael F. Toney
 Megan T. Valentine
 Richard G. Van de Water
 Maxim G. Vavilov
 Nikolay Vinokurov
 Smitha Vishveshwara
 Petia M. Vlahovska
 Dimitris Vlassopoulos
 Tracy John Vogler
 Bryan Vogt
 Anastasia Volovich
 Sarah L. Waters
 Charles Albert Weatherford
 Peter Bernard Weichman
 Neal Weiner
 Anne Elisabeth White
 Marion M. White
 Claus Wilke
 David A. Williams
 Chee Wei Wong
 Jing Xia
 Huili Grace Xing
 Hongqi Xu
 Ting Xu
 Jing Zhang
 Xin Zhang
 Mingfei Zhou
 Ye Zhou
 Xiaoqin Zou

2020

 Jan Aarts
 Snezhana I. Abarzhi
 Katherine Aidala
 Paul R. Anderson
 Almudena Arcones
 John Ballato
 Emanuela Barberis
 Stephen D. Bartlett
 Geoffrey S. D. Beach
 Carlo Beenakker
 Elena Belova
 Richard L. Berger
 Claude Bourbonnais
 Bernd Bruegmann
 James H. Buckley
 Kevin Burkett
 Guido Caldarelli
 Roger D. Carlini
 Gerbrand Ceder
 Martin Centurion
 Luis Chacon
 Yann R. Chemla
 Li-Jen Chen
 Geraldine L. Cochran
 Itai Cohen
 Sarah Cousineau
 Richard Craster
 Alexander D. Cronin
 James P. Cryan
 Ruth A. Daly
 James R. Danielson
 Lucilla De Arcangelis
 Carlos Henrique De Brito Cruz
 Emanuela Del Gado
 Jason A. Detwiler
 Sanjeev Dhurandhar
 Ronald Dickman
 Laurent Divol
 Bhaskar Dutta
 Karl M.Ecklund
 
 Andrea Favalli
 Max E. Fenstermacher
 Marivi Fernandez-Serra
 Brian Fields
 Lucy Frear Fortson
 Seth Fraden
 Scott Franklin
 Ashot Gasparian
 Massimo Giovannozzi
 Feliciano Giustino
 Alexander Glaser
 Ajay Gopinathan
 Alexey V. Gorshkov
 Richard Gran
 Gregory M. Grason
 Anna Grassellino
 Houyang Guo
 Hartmut Haeffner
 Michael F. Hagan
 Zahra Hazari
 Sean J. Hearne
 Laura Henriques
 Michel Houssa
 Wenbing Hu
 Yun Hang Hu
 Daniel S. Hussey
 Nicholas Hutchins
 Arthi Jayaraman
 Jinfeng Jia
 Javier Junquera
 Suzanne Amador Kane
 Richard B. Kaner
 Manoj Kaplinghat
 Eun-Ah Kim
 Israel Klich
 Mathias Kläui
 Corinna Kollath
 Ilya Krivorotov
 Shelly Rae Lesher
 Tim Lieuwen
 Maria Antonietta Loi
 Cecilia Lunardini
 Mahesh K. Mahanthappa
 Suliana Manley
 Scott X. Mao
 Alison L. Marsden
 Alberto A. Martinez
 Reina Maruyama
 Sergei Maslov
 Harsh Mathur
 Andrey B Matsko
 Robert F. McDermott
 Ralph Menikoff
 Yuri Mishin
 Bedangadas Mohanty
 Michael H. Moloney
 Gregory W. Moore
 Yasunobu Nakamura
 Sae W. Nam
 Onuttom Narayan
 Art J Nelson
 Kaixuan Ni
 Ruth Nussinov
 Brian C. Odom
 Vadim Oganesyan
 Artem R Oganov
 Andrea Palounek
 Arun Paramekanti
 Raghuveer Parthasarathy
 Barbara Pasquini
 Stefano Profumo
 Nini Pryds
 Jonathan F. Reichert
 Günter Reiter
 David Richards
 Heike Riel
 Kenneth P. Rodbell
 Vincent Gerald J. Rogers
 Sylvie Roke
 J. Ryan Rygg
 Bidhan Chandra Saha
 Rita M. Sambruna
 Mayly Sanchez
 Edl Schamiloglu
 Dominik A. Schneble
 Susan M. Scott
 Raymond Shaw
 Olga Shishkina
 Mário G. Silveirinha
 Jennifer Sinclair Curtis
 Nikolai Sinitsyn
 Dirk Smit
 Scott Smith
 Panagiotis Spentzouris
 Spitkovsky Anatoly
 Jeff Squier
 Steinar Stapnes
 Oleg Starykh
 Joseph E. Subotnik
 Chao Sun
 Kandice Tanner
 Yoshinori Tokura
 Blas Pedro Uberuaga
 Patricia Vahle
 Dieter Vollhardt
 Jian-Ping Wang
 Deborah K. Watson
 Thorsten Weber
 Jonathan David Weinstein
 Ingo Wiedenhoever
 Richard J. Wiener
 Fred E. Wietfeldt
 Belinda J. Wilkes
 Carol A. Wilkinson
 Dao Xiang
 Xiaodong Xu
 Lan Yang
 Wang Yao
 Peter Zapol
 Eugene Zaretsky
 Jun Zhu
 Eric D. Zimmerman

2021

 Kaustubh Agashe
 Emilio Artacho
 Kétévi Adiklè Assamagan
 Faical Azaiez
 Oliver K. Baker
 Stefan W. Ballmer
 Arun Bansil
 Denis Bartolo
 Dani S. Bassett
 Larry R. Baylor
 Pierre Berini
 Antony N. Beris
 Lydia Bieri
 Geoffrey A. Blake
 Dave H. A. Blank
 Daniel Bonn
 Dimitri Bourilkov
 Lydia Bourouiba
 Eric Nathaniel Brown
 Jean Carlson
 Patrick Charbonneau
 Jerry M. Chow
 Ibrahim I. Cissé
 Cristiano Ciuti
 Aurora E. Clark
 Jason Clark
 Aashish Clerk
 Kyle Cranmer
 Catherine Hirshfeld Crouch
 Beth A. Cunningham
 Andrew J. Daley
 José María De Teresa
 Michael Dennin
 Tilo Doeppner
 Christian Forssén
 John Edison Foster
 Giuliano Franchetti
 Gerardo Herrera-Corral
 Lawrence Gibbons
 Naomi S. Ginsberg
 Alexander Golubov
 Enrique D. Gomez
 Adrian M. Gozar
 David Gracias
 Laura Grego
 Subhadeep Gupta
 Mohammad Hafezi
 Andrew F. Heckler
 Thomas Hemmick
 Linda S. Hirst
 Andrew Houck
 Christine Hrenya
 Sungwoo Hwang
 Maria Iavarone
 Takeyasu Ito
 Kohei Itoh
 Mary B. James
 Liang Jiang
 Clifford V. Johnson
 Gerceida E. Adams-Jones
 Matthew P. Juniper
 Helmut G. Katzgraber
 Gaurav Khanna
 Jungsang Kim
 Alexander Kramida
 Peter Kuchment
 Aaron Gilad Kusne
 François Légaré
 David R. Leibrandt
 Benjamin L. Lev
 Dov Levine
 Xiaosong Li
 Yury Litvinov
 Hong Liu
 Alberto Loarte
 Andrew R. Lupini
 Tammy Ma
 Kin Fai Mak
 Jamie L. Manson
 Christina Markert
 Christopher L. Martin
 Lane W. Martin
 Alan J. H. McGaughey
 Maura McLaughlin
 Zia Mian
 Arlene Modeste Knowles
 Nathan A. Moody
 Yamir Moreno
 Lowell Morgan
 Swagato Mukherjee
 Salah Obayya
 Chad Orzel
 Valerie K. Otero
 Hanhee Paik
 Christos Panagopoulos
 Casey Papovich
 Moon Jeong Park
 Joel R. Parriott
 Thomas Peacock
 Katherine K. Perkins
 Kristin A. Persson
 Charles C. Polly
 Vivek M. Prabhu
 Soren Prestemon
 Geoff Pryde
 Qing Qin
 Anna M. Quider
 Srinivas Raghu
 Venkatachalam Ramaswamy
 Ainissa Ramirez
 Claudia Ratti
 Paul E. Reimer
 Peter W. A. Roming
 Steven James Rose
 Matthew S. Rosen
 Todd Satogata
 Monika Schleier-Smith
 Piet O. Schmidt
 Jörg Schumacher
 Alice Shapley
 Amy Q. Shen
 Kyle M. Shen
 Steinn Sigurðsson
 Michelle Yvonne Simmons
 Maksim Skorobogatiy
 Fernando Sols
 Jeff Sonier
 Artemisia Spyrou
 Michael Swisdak
 Gil Travish
 Tommaso Treu
 Christy S. Tyberg
 Arpita Upadhyaya
 Bernhard Urbaszek
 Martin van Hecke
 Jacobus Verbaarschot
 Madeline Wade
 Yau W. Wah
 Aleksandra Walczak
 Jigang Wang
 YuHuang Wang
 Alan Eli Willner
 Gillian Wilson
 Lindley Winslow
 Mingzhong Wu
 Matthieu Wyart
 Hongjun Xiang
 Xueqiao Xu
 Wanli Yang
 Hong Yao
 Bilge Can Yildiz
 Yu Dapeng
 Huiqiu Yuan
 Sam Zeller
 Bei Zeng

2022

 Kevork N. Abazajian
 Wague Ahmadou
 Alfonso M. Albano
 Michael G. Albrow
 Stephon Haigh Solomon Alexander
 Andrei Alexandru
 Ehud Altman
 Arezoo Ardekani
 Paulo Arratia
 Crystal D. Bailey
 Dan Bardayan
 Ramón S. Barthelemy
 Andrei Bernevig
 Christoph Boehme
 Kenneth S. Burch
 Juan Ramon Burciaga
 Marcos (Danny) Caballero
 Wesley C. Campbell
 Fabrizio Carbone
 Jean Bio Chabi Orou
 Chong-Sun Chu
 Jacinta C. Conrad
 Jodi Cooley
 Jose Crespo Lopez-Urrutia
 Gianaurelio Cuniberti
 Nir Davidson
 Franklin Dollar
 Olga Dudko
 Eric Robert Dufresne
 Emily E. Edwards
 Juan Estrada
 Renee Fatemi
 Alexei V. Fedotov
 Steven Flammia
 Zoltan Fodor
 Tara Fortier
 Santo Fortunato
 Anna Frebel
 Raymond Frey
 Jonathan R. Friedman
 Carla Fröhlich
 Liang Fu
 Ibiyinka Fuwape
 Maia Garcia Vergniory
 Clayton A. Gearhart
 Nuh Gedik
 Jose Gordillo Arias de Saavedra
 Thomas Gregor
 Leo Gross
 Or Hen
 Angela R. Hight Walker
 Michael Hildreth
 Mary Y. P. Hockaday
 Philip Hofmann
 James Hone
 Jorge Íñiguez
 Mustapha Ishak-Boushaki
 Prashant K. Jain
 Mona Jarrahi
 Robert Jeraj
 Michael B. Johnston
 Scott Kable
 Eva Kanso
 Justin C. Kasper
 Keita Kawabe
 Craig Kletzing
 Michael Kohl
 Frank Koppens
 LaShanda Korley
 Lena F. Kourkoutis
 Laird H. Kramer
 Per Kraus
 Srinivas Krishnagopal
 Andrea Lynn Kritcher
 Matt Landreman
 Kyung-Jin Lee
 Daniela Leitner
 Alex Levchenko
 Lu Li
 Huey-Wen Lin
 Nicole Lloyd-Ronning
 Maria Longobardi
 Nuno Loureiro
 Andrew D. Ludlow
 Roman Lutchyn
 Alysia D. Marino
 Joseph D. Martin
 Paul Martini
 David A. Mazziotti
 Elizabeth McCutchan
 Malcolm I. McMahon
 Zetian Mi
 Ling Miao
 Giovanna Morigi
 Smadar Naoz
 Shobhana Narasimhan
 Robert J. Nemiroff
 Ni Ni
 Eve Ostriker
 Nicholas T. Ouellette
 Vittorio Paolone
 Jiwoong Park
 Gloria Platero
 Eric Pop
 Maxim Pospelov
 Claude A. Pruneau
 Siddharth Ramachandran
 Sumathi Rao
 Rae M Robertson-Anderson
 Radu Roiban
 Mark Steven Rzchowski
 Arvinder Sandhu
 Srikanth Sastry
 Björn Peter Schenke
 Friederike Schmid
 Wolfgang Schröder
 David Schuster
 Fredrick Hampton Seguin
 Ronnie Shepherd
 Dava Sobel
 Rolando D. Somma
 Andrew Steiner
 Gregory J. Stephens
 Michael Tarbutt
 Richard P. Taylor
 Jesse Thaler
 Jean-Luc Thiffeault
 Matthew C. Thompson
 Evelyn Thomson
 Oskar Vafek
 Sergio O. Valenzuela
 Geoffrey K. Vallis
 Devaraj R. M. van der Meer
 Michael Van Zeeland
 Lieven M. K. Vandersypen
 Rama K. Vasudevan
 Lynn M. Walker
 Donnell Walton
 Yifang Wang
 Mitchell Wayne
 Louise Willingale
 Paul Woafo
 Daniel Worledge
 Di Xiao
 Yugui Yao
 Jaehoon Yu
 Nicolas Yunes
 Tamer A. Zaki
 Roya Zandi
 Hui Zhai
 Gang Zhang
 Shuang Zhang
 Weiping Zhang
 Junjie Zhu
 Lei Zhu
 Eva Zurek

See also
 List of American Physical Society Fellows (1921–1971)
 List of American Physical Society Fellows (1972–1997)
 List of American Physical Society Fellows (1998–2010)

References 

2011